George Hepburn (died 9 September 1513) was the son of Adam Hepburn and brother to Patrick Hepburn, the first Earl of Bothwell.

He was a churchman, and served firstly as postulate Abbot of Arbroath, before becoming Lord High Treasurer of Scotland for a brief spell in 1509.  Serving in that role only for a short time, he was consecrated as Bishop of the Isles in 1510 and was also Commendator of the Abbeys of Arbroath and Icolmkill.

He was killed at the Battle of Flodden in 1513, as was his brother Adam and his nephew, also Adam, the second Earl of Bothwell.

References

Abbots of Arbroath
Bishops of the Isles
Deaths at the Battle of Flodden
15th-century Scottish people
16th-century Scottish people
Scottish military personnel killed in action
1513 deaths
Lord High Treasurers of Scotland
15th-century births